Fr. Sheehys GAA is a Gaelic Athletic Association gaelic football and Hurling club located in Clogheen in South Tipperary in Ireland. The club is part of the South division of Tipperary GAA and represents the areas of Clogheen and Burncourt. In 1972 the club were renamed Fr. Sheehy's, combining Burncourt Football Club and Clogheen Hurling Club which were both formed in the 1930s. The club is named after Nicholas Sheehy who was a Parish priest in the Clogheen and Burncourt area at the time of his death in 1766.

Achievements
 Tipperary Intermediate Football Championship (1) 1984
 South Tipperary Intermediate Football Championship (5) 1978, 1981, 1984, 2001, 2018
 Tipperary Junior A Hurling Championship (1) 2001
 South Tipperary Junior Hurling Championship (1) 2001
 South Tipperary Under-21 B Football Championship (1) 2002
 South Tipperary Under-21 B Hurling Championship (1) 1995, 1998
 Tipperary Under-21 C Hurling Championship (1) 2012
 South Tipperary Under-21 C Hurling Championship (2) 2002, 2011
 South Tipperary Minor A Football Championship (1) 1980 (with Ballylooby)
 South Tipperary Minor B Football Championship (1) 1993
 South Tipperary Minor C Football Championship (1) 2004
 South Tipperary Minor B Hurling Championship (1) 1993

Notable players

 
Sean Flynn ( way better than his brother cormac),
Ben Hyland,

References

External links
Official Site
GAA Info Site
Tipperary GAA site

Gaelic games clubs in County Tipperary